is a small district in Kōhoku-ku, Yokohama, Kanagawa Prefecture, Japan.

Buildings and attractions
 Shin-Yokohama Station
 Kita Shin-Yokohama Station
 Shin-Yokohama Raumen Museum
 Yokohama Arena
 Nissan Stadium
 Shin Yokohama Prince Hotel
 Winds Shin-Yokohama
 Yokohama Rapport
 Shin-Yokohama Park
 Kohoku Police Station
 Yokohama Rosai Hospital

Geography of Yokohama